Thelymitra azurea, commonly called the azure sun orchid, is a species of orchid that is endemic to south-eastern Australia. It has a single fleshy, grass-like leaf and up to ten dark azure blue flowers with darker veins. The lobe on top of the anther has a toothed or warty tip.

Description
The lobe on the top of the anther is short and dark purplish with a toothed or warty yellow tip. The side lobes have white or purplish, mop-like tufts on their ends. The flowers are insect-pollinated and open on warm days. Flowering occurs from September to December.

Taxonomy and naming
Thelymitra azurea was first formally described in 1917 by R.S. Rogers and the description was published in Transactions and Proceedings of the Royal Society of South Australia. The specific epithet (azurea) is a Latinised version of the French word azure meaning "a blue colour", referring to "the beautiful colour of the flowers".

Distribution and habitat
The azure sun orchid grows in heath and forest in western Victoria and south-eastern South Australia, including Kangaroo Island.

References

External links

azurea
Endemic orchids of Australia
Orchids of South Australia
Orchids of Victoria (Australia)
Plants described in 1917